The Neighbors is an American science fiction comedy series that premiered on September 26, 2012, on ABC. The series was created by Dan Fogelman, and follows a family of humans who relocate to a gated community, which happens to be inhabited by aliens.

44 episodes of The Neighbors aired over the series' two seasons.

Series overview

Episodes

Season 1 (2012–13)

Season 2 (2013–14)

References

External links
  at ABC.com
 

Episodes
Neighbors